The Fremantle Passenger Terminal was  built on Victoria Quay, Fremantle in 1960–62,  The construction replaced the former cargo sheds located at the site of construction.

It was opened in time for arrival of competitors for the Empire Games in 1962. The terminal is the largest in Australia and is the only passenger terminal in Australia capable of berthing two cruise liners simultaneously.

Significance
In 2000 the building was permanently listed on the State Register of Heritage Places, was classified by the National Trust in 2001, and was also registered on the former Register of the National Estate.  Its 50th anniversary was celebrated in 2010.

History
Since its construction, Fremantle Harbour has been the major port of call for vessels of all types, including ocean liners bringing migrants and tourists to Western Australia. In the 1950s the Fremantle Port Authority recognised the need to improve the facilities for processing arrivals as the post World War II immigration policy was seeing large number of migrants arriving in Fremantle. The arrivals were being processed in sheds and offices on Victoria Quay, so it was decided to build dedicated facilities. The planning, which commenced in 1957, considered the future needs of the port, so designed a facility capable of processing two ocean liners simultaneously. Hobbs, Winning and Leighton was the architectural firm that designed the building in the post war international style, with AT Brine & Sons and the Fremantle Harbour Trust commencing construction in 1958.

The first stage F shed was opened by Premier David Brand in December 1960. The SS Oriana on its maiden voyage was the first vessel to berth at the new terminal. Between the opening of the first stage and the opening of the second stage G shed in May 1962 over 250,000 passengers passed through the terminal.

In the 2000s, as ocean pleasure cruises became more popular it was briefly designated as the Fremantle Cruise Terminal. After receiving criticism from Carnival Cruise Line at the outdated state of the terminal in early 2017, the building received an upgrade and refurbishment which was completed in January 2019.

Events
At various stages the terminal has been utilised for events.

References

External links

 "Freo... way to go for cruising" – article by Niall McIlroy in The West Australian about boarding a cruise ship at Fremantle Passenger Terminal

Buildings and structures in Fremantle
Fremantle Harbour
Passenger ship terminals
State Register of Heritage Places in the City of Fremantle
1960 establishments in Australia